Jemaluang is a town and mukim in Mersing District, Johor, Malaysia.

Geography

Jemaluang lies on the intersection of national highway 3 and 50.

The mukim (commune) surrounding the town spans over an area of 124 km2 and also includes 10 nearby villages.

Geology
The mukim also includes Belunak Island. It is worth noting that Jemaluang is not located in mukim Jemaluang.

References

Mukims of Mersing District
Towns in Johor